Purnendu Mukherjee was an Indian actor active from 1960-1989. He starred in Satyajit Ray's Devi and the Bollywood film Ek Doctor Ki Maut. He was most famous for a Bengali film, Guru Dakshina, in which he costarred with Tapas Paul, Ranjit Mallick, and Satabdi Roy. He was also credited as Purnendu Ganguli and Purnendu Mukhopadhyay.

Filmography

References

External links 

 

Bengali actors
People from Kolkata